Janin  is a village in the administrative district of Gmina Starogard Gdański, within Starogard County, Pomeranian Voivodeship, in northern Poland.

Geography 

History 
For details of the history of the region, see History of Pomerania.

Demographics 
The village has a population of 130.

References

Janin